Tyrrell or Tyrell is an Anglo-Irish surname.

People with this name include:

 Agnes Tyrrell (1846-1883), a Czech composer and pianist
 Alan Tyrrell (1933 –2014), British lawyer and politician
Dr Carina Tyrrell (born 1989), British-Swiss physician, model, and beauty competition titleholder
Dame Elizabeth Tyrrell (née Ussher) (1619–1693), daughter of James Ussher chronologicalist of Bible
 Emmett Tyrrell (born 1943), American author and editor
 George Tyrrell (1861-1909), priest and Modernist scholar
 George Nugent Merle Tyrrell, English author, introduced the term "out-of-body experience"
 George Walter Tyrrell (1883-1961), British geologist
 Ian Tyrrell, Australian historian
 Jackie Tyrrell (born 1982), Irish hurler
 James Tyrrell (c. 1450–1502), English knight
 James Tyrrell (Oakley) (1643–1718), Commissioner of the Privy Seal
 John Tyrrell (disambiguation), multiple people
 Joseph Tyrrell (1858–1957), Canadian geologist, discoverer of the dinosaur Albertosaurus, and namesake of the Royal Tyrrell Museum
 Kate Tyrrell (1863–1921), Irish sailor and shipping company owner, captain of the Denbighshire Lass
 Ken Tyrrell (1924–2001), auto racing driver and the founder of the Tyrrell Formula One constructor
 Sir Murray Tyrrell (1913–1994), Official Secretary to several Governors General of Australia
 Murray Tyrrell (winemaker) (1921–2000), prominent Australian winemaker
 Richard Tyrell (1716?–1766), Rear Admiral
 Robert Yelverton Tyrrell, classical scholar at Trinity College, Dublin
in citations 'Tyrrell-Purser' or 'Tyrrell and Purser' refer to his collaborations with Louis Claude Purser
 Susan Tyrrell (c. 1945–2012), American actress of Irish descent
 Sir Timothy Tyrrell (died 1632), Master of the Buckhounds to Prince Henry and Charles I of England
 Sir Timothy Tyrrell, (1617–1701), Master of the Buckhounds to Charles I of England
 Walter Tirel (or Tyrell), (1065 – some time after 1100), an Anglo-Norman nobleman rumored to have killed King William Rufus with an arrow while hunting in the New Forest
 William Tyrrell (disambiguation), multiple people

See also
Terrell (surname)
Terrill

References